Love Chronicles is a 2003 romantic comedy, written and directed by Tyler Maddox-Simms. The film stars Clifton Powell, LisaRaye McCoy, Robin Givens, and Terrence Howard.

Plot
A pair of talk show hosts Sara (Paula Jai Parker) Troy aka T-Roy (Terrence Howard) team with a relationship-guide author Monifa Burley (Robin Givens) to help listeners improve their relationships. Eventually, the trio unwittingly expose their own love-related baggage. Love Chronicles screened at the American Black Film Festival in June 2003 & was released theatrically on December 31, 2003.

Cast
 Terrence Howard as "T-Roy"
 Robin Givens as Monifa Burly
 LisaRaye McCoy as Marie Tousaant
 Clifton Powell as Thomas
 Al Clegg as Marcus
 Aries Spears as Playa
 Buddy Lewis as Male Nurse
 Chris Spencer as Gavin
 Darrel Heath as Kenny
 Holly Joy Gaines as Tamia
 Kym Whitley as Renee
 Monica Calhoun as Maya
 Paula Jai Parker as Sara
 Tommy "Tiny" Lister as Alfonso
 Tracey Cherelle Jones as Nikkola

External links
 
 

2003 films
African-American films
2003 romantic comedy films
African-American romantic comedy films
2000s English-language films
2000s American films